German submarine U-34 was a Type VIIA U-boat of Nazi Germany's Kriegsmarine during World War II.

She was laid down in September 1935, launched in July 1936 and commissioned in September.

U-34 and sister boat U-33 took part in Operation Ursula during the Spanish Civil War, with U-34 becoming the first German submarine to sink another vessel since the end of World War I in 1918.
During World War II the boat carried out seven patrols, sinking 22 ships and capturing two more. She was sunk in a collision in the Baltic in August 1943.

Design
As one of the first ten German Type VII submarines later designated as Type VIIA submarines, U-34 had a displacement of  when at the surface and  while submerged. She had two shafts and two  propellers.

U-34 was fitted with five  torpedo tubes (four fitted at the bow and one at the stern), eleven torpedoes, one  SK C/35 naval gun, 220 rounds, and an anti-aircraft gun. The boat had a complement of between forty-four and sixty.

Service history
She was laid down on 15 September 1935 by the Germaniawerft at Kiel as yard number 557, launched on 17 July 1936 and commissioned on 12 September 1936 under the command of Kapitänleutnant (Kptlt.) Ernst Sobe.

U-34 was, after commissioning, a part of the 2nd U-boat Flotilla until September 1940. She was then sent to the 21st flotilla for less than a month. She spent almost the next three years with the 24th flotilla.

Spanish Civil War
U-34 took part in Operation Ursula—the German submarine operation in support of Franco's naval forces during the Spanish Civil War. Under the command of Kptlt. Harald Grosse, she sank the Spanish Republican Navy submarine C-3 off the coast of Malaga on 12 December 1936.

World War II

First patrol
The U-boat left Wilhelmshaven (which was to be her base until July 1940), on 19 August 1939. Her route took her across the North Sea to the 'gap' between Iceland and the Faroe Islands. She entered the Atlantic Ocean on about the 24th and headed south, to the west of Ireland.

She also damaged, then captured Hanonia and her cargo of timber off Norway. The ship had been bound for a British port, but instead she was taken to Kiel and on to Hamburg by a prize crew.

The boat returned to Wilhelmshaven on 26 September.

Second patrol
U-34s second foray was even more fruitful, sinking Gustav Adolf and Sea Venture (which had replied to the U-boats' warning shots with fire of her own), both on 20 October 1939. Bronte on the 27th and Malabar went to the bottom on the 29th. The boat also captured Snar in the North Sea on 9 November.

Third patrol
The first victim of this sortie was Caroni River in Falmouth Bay on 20 January 1940.

The survivors were eventually rescued by Michael Casey, a fisherman from Kerry, who towed them to Portmagee. 13 died of exposure. The 20 survivors were so weak that they had to be carried ashore.

Fourth and fifth patrols
Patrol number four, in March 1940, was through the North Sea and the Norwegian Sea. It was remarkable only for its lack of 'kills'.

U-34 torpedoed the already scuttled Norwegian minelayer  on 13 April 1940 near Søtvika to prevent her salvage.

Sixth patrol
The boat used the so-called Faroes/Shetland 'gap' (which she had cleared by 26 June 1940), to enter the Atlantic; she had left Wilhelmshaven on the 22nd.

Less than 24 hours later she had also accounted for Vapper south of Cape Clear, (southern Ireland).

There followed a steady stream of victories in the same area: Lucrecia, Tiiu, Petamo, Janna and Evdoxia. Having run out of torpedoes, U-34 sank Naftilos with gunfire.

The boat docked at the newly occupied port of Lorient, on the French Atlantic coast, on 18 July.

Seventh patrol
The sinkings continued; Vinnemoor on 26 July 1940; Accra on the same day and in the same attack and Sambre and Thiara, both on the 27th. Returning to Germany, the boat came across the British submarine . Using her last torpedo, the U-boat managed to sink the British unit. There was only one survivor from Spearfish, he was captured by the Germans.

Fate
She was sunk at 21:55 on 5 August 1943 at Memel (today's Klaipėda in Lithuania), in the Baltic, in position  after a collision with the U-boat tender Lech. Four men died, although 39 survived. The boat was raised on 24 August but stricken on 8 September 1943.

Summary of raiding history

References

Notes

Citations

Bibliography

External links

German Type VIIA submarines
U-boats commissioned in 1936
U-boats sunk in 1943
Military units and formations of Nazi Germany in the Spanish Civil War
World War II submarines of Germany
1936 ships
Ships built in Kiel
U-boat accidents
U-boats sunk in collisions
World War II shipwrecks in the Baltic Sea
Maritime incidents in August 1943